The transporter-opsin-G protein-coupled receptor (TOG) superfamily is a protein superfamily of integral membrane proteins, usually of 7 or 8 transmembrane alpha-helical segments (TMSs). It includes (1) ion-translocating microbial rhodopsins  and (2) G protein-coupled receptors (GPCRs), (3) Sweet sugar transporters, (4) nicotinamide ribonucleoside uptake permeases (PnuC; TC# 4.B.1), (5) 4-toluene sulfonate uptake permeases (TSUP); TC# 2.A.102), (6) Ni2+–Co2+ transporters (NiCoT); TC# 2.A.52), (7) organic solute transporters (OST); TC# 2.A.82), (8) phosphate:Na+ symporters (PNaS); TC# 2.A.58) and (9) lysosomal cystine transporters (LCT); TC# 2.A.43).

Families

Currently recognized families within the TOG Superfamily (with TC numbers in blue) include:
 1.A.14 - The Testis-enhanced Gene Transfer (TEGT) Family
 1.A.26 - The Mg2+ Transporter-E (MgtE) Family
 1.A.76 - The Magnesium Transporter1 (MagT1) Family
 2.A.43 - The Lysosomal Cystine Transporter (LCT) Family
 2.A.52 - The Ni2+-Co2+ Transporter (NiCoT) Family
 2.A.58 - The Phosphate:Na+ Symporter (PNaS) Family
 2.A.82 - The Organic Solute Transporter (OST) Family
 2.A.102 - The 4-Toluene Sulfonate Uptake Permease (TSUP) Family
 2.A.123 - The Sweet; PQ-loop; Saliva; MtN3 (Sweet) Family
 3.E.1 - The Ion-translocating Microbial Rhodopsin (MR) Family
 4.B.1 - The Nicotinamide Ribonucleoside (NR) Uptake Permease (PnuC) Family
 9.A.14 - The G-protein-coupled receptor (GPCR) Family

Structures

A couple of the 3-D structures available for members of the following families include:
 SWEET family: 
 MR family: ,  - high resolution structures
 PnuC family: 
 GPCR family:

See also
 Solute carrier family
 Transporter Classification Database

References

Further reading

 

Transmembrane transporters
Protein superfamilies